Shooting is the act or process of discharging a projectile from a ranged weapon (such as a gun, bow, crossbow, slingshot, or blowpipe). Even the acts of launching flame, artillery, darts, harpoons, grenades, rockets, and guided missiles can be considered acts of shooting.  When using a firearm, the act of shooting is often called firing as it involves initiating a combustion (deflagration) of chemical propellants.

Shooting can take place in a shooting range or in the field, in shooting sports, hunting, or in combat.  The person involved in the shooting activity is called a shooter.  A skilled, accurate shooter is a marksman or sharpshooter, and a person's level of shooting proficiency is referred to as their marksmanship.

Competitive shooting

Shooting has inspired competition, and in several countries rifle clubs started to form in the 19th century. Soon international shooting events evolved, including shooting at the Summer and Winter Olympics (from 1896) and World Championships (from 1897). The International Shooting Sport Federation still administers Olympic and non-Olympic rifle, pistol, shotgun, and running target shooting competitions, although there is also a large number of national and international shooting sports controlled by unrelated organizations.

Shooting technique differs depending on factors like the type of firearm used (from a handgun to a precision rifle); the distance to and nature of the target; the required precision; and the available time. Breathing and position play an important role when handling a handgun or a rifle. Some shooting sports, such as IPSC shooting and biathlon also include movement. The prone position, kneeling position, and standing position offer different amounts of support for the shooter.

Hunting with guns 

In the United Kingdom shooting often refers to the activity of hunting game birds such as grouse or pheasants, or small game such as rabbits, with guns.  A shooter is sometimes referred to as a "gun".  Shooting may also refer to the culling of vermin with guns. Clay pigeon shooting is meant to simulate shooting pigeons released from traps after live birds were banned in the United Kingdom in 1921.

Weapons
Shooting most often refers to the use of a gun (firearm or air gun), although it can also be used to describe discharging of any ranged weapons like a bow, crossbow, slingshot, or even blowpipe.  The term "weapon" does not necessarily mean it is used as a combat tool, but as a piece of equipment to help the user best achieve the hit on their intended targets.

Shooting is also used in warfare, self-defense, crime, and law enforcement.  Duels were sometimes held using guns. Shooting without a target has applications such as celebratory gunfire, 21-gun salute, or firing starting pistols, incapable of releasing bullets.

Restrictions
In many countries, there are restrictions on what kind of firearm can be bought and by whom, leading to debate about how effective such measures are and the extent to which they should be applied.  For example, attitudes towards guns and shooting in the United States are very different from those in the United Kingdom and Australia.

Canting

Canting is an alignment issue that occurs in shooting. Because scopes need to be mounted to a rifle in perfect parallel to the barrel and to ensure the cross hairs sit exactly where a bullet will go (POI), a small variation of even ¼ of one degree can cause great problems at longer ranges. A locking bar holds the mount in a perfect 90 degree to the rail system whereas a non-locking bar system can cant to the left or right. This canting (sometimes called jamming of surfaces) is caused by not matching the clamping surface perfectly to the rail. When tightened down, stress exerted on the base can cause the scope to be off from the POI by as much as several feet at 100–200 yards and gets progressively worse as range increases. Lower grade materials used in manufacturing of scope bases, inconsistent design tolerances from one manufacturer to another and other factors can cause twisting stress and cause the mount to move out of parallel with the rifle barrel. The locking bar system allows for even stress to be distributed and prevent canting of the scope mount. Another form of scope canting is caused by the rings themselves. Some mounts either have two or four screws on top of the scope ring that hold the scope in place. With the two-screw style, the ring usually aligns well but does not have the strength of the four screw system. When tightening the screws of the four screw type, the scope can twist in place, causing misalignment.

Shooting positions

The National Rifle Association of America defines four basic "competition" or "field" shooting positions. In order of steadiness/stability (the closer you get to the ground, the steadier you are), they are prone, sitting, kneeling, and standing (also called "offhand").

Hythe positions (Hythe School of Musketry was formed in 1853 to teach the army how to use the rifle in kneeling and standing positions), American and French positions were known variations of the kneeling and standing positions utilised by their respective armies.

Another common, but aided, shooting position is the bench shooting position. There are also numerous shooting aids from monopods to tripods to sandbags and complete gun cradles.

Prone
 The steadiest and by far the easiest to master. Done correctly. it can be as steady as shooting from a bench rest.
 Probably the least used in the field because, all too often, vegetation gets in the way and obscures the view.
 Variations:
 classic – with the body at an angle (left for right-handed people, right for left-handed)
 modern – with the body more directly behind the rifle with the shooter's strong side leg slightly bent.
 Test for correct body position: wrap your arm into the hasty sling and drop down into prone, sighting at the target. Close your eyes. When you open them you should still be aiming at the target. If you aren't, then your position is off. Also, if the shooter's sight picture returns after the firm kicks to each muzzle, then body alignment is good. If not, adjustment is needed.
 Usual advice is to use a sling for this position
 Aided prone position – prone with pack or bipod

Sitting
 This position is relatively easy to get into, but more difficult to get out of quickly and provides clearance for low to medium-height obstacles that would interfere with the prone position.
 Proper sitting position is extremely difficult to master.
 Variations:
 open leg
 cross leg (aka pretzel style) – the steadiest sitting position.
 cross ankle
 The test for correct body position is the same as prone.
 Usual advice is to use a sling for this position.
 Aided sitting position – sitting with tripod

Kneeling
 There were numerous variations of the position throughout history.
 Best for times when shooter needs to shoot quickly, but it is a bit too far (or he is breathing a bit too hard) to risk a shot from the standing position.
 Considerably steadier than standing position.
 For most people it is not nearly as steady as sitting but it is much faster to get in and out of.
 For some people this position can be almost as steady as the prone position.
 Strong-side knee is on the ground, weak-side knee and foot are pointing at the target while weak-side knee is supporting the elbow (It is important that the bony tip of the elbow not be planted on top of the knee cap – bone-on-bone contact allows for too much movement or it can slip.) 
 Variations:
 sitting on strong-side foot
 with strong-side foot flat
 sitting on the strong-side foot's heel with the toes grounded
 Usual advice is to use a sling for this position.
Aided kneeling position – kneeling with crossed sticks or tripod

Standing (or offhand)
 The quickest position to assume and is useful for quick shots and for shooting over objects.
 By far is the least steadiest of all positions. A common trait is a bit of sway in this position. The trick is learning to control the sway and fire when the shooter is at his steadiest. Breathing exercises help in maintaining the balance of the body in this position.
 The most difficult position to shoot from and to master. Mostly common among both air pistol and air rifle shooters shooting from different ranges (10m,25m,50m).
 Stock fit is essential in standing – perhaps more than in any other position. Shooter needs to have his cheek firmly welded to the stock.
 Variations:
 squared toward the target – advantages of this technique are that it allows the shooter to absorb the rifle's recoil much more effectively, to run the bolt and get back on target quickly. It also places the shooter in a more aggressive stance that allows him to move, in just about any direction, as his target requires.
 bladed stance of the rifle marksman
 Usual advice is not to use the sling for support in this position.
Aided standing position
Standing with sticks and stones
 Three-legged shooting sticks are almost universal in Africa.
 Whatever shooter's comfortable range is for offhand shooting, sticks should double it.

Rice paddy squat in rifle shooting 

The rice paddy squat (or rice paddy prone) position is a moderate-stability position that supports both elbows, making it more stable than kneeling yet keeping a high level of mobility. Its higher center of gravity will still be less stable than sitting or prone. It was a traditionally taught marksmanship position but lost popularity after the Korean conflict.

Back (or supine)
It was sometimes referred to as the Creedmoor position. There are a number of variations of the position. It was known in the latter half of the 18th century, and later revived by a small number of shooters in the 1860s with the introduction of competitive long range shooting at the NRA rifle meetings and continued in use into the 20th century amongst match riflemen. The position was really developed during the 1870s as a consequence of great interest in long range shooting associated with the international matches. Back position provided the most stable platform for the rifle in those competitions where no artificial support, including slings, was permitted. It was even superior to shooting prone unsupported.

Lying on one's side
Lying on one's side is not a normally chosen position, but may be a position fallen into when reacting to a threat. In this scenario, it may be used behind a barricade to present a very small target since normally only the gun hand and a piece of one's face is exposed, with the rest covered by the barricade.

Leaning
When a shooter is leaning on something like a wall, a tree or post. The rifle barrel should not be rested against it because it is steadier to lean the body. It's usually combined with standing and kneeling positions.

Slings
Shooting sling
The sling is used to create isometric pressure to increase steadiness. While the use of a sling is of questionable value when shooting from the standing position, it is very much worth using from kneeling, sitting or prone. It was also used in back position in which case the sling is looped around the foot and it is this that takes the recoil. Proper use of the sling locks the rifle into the body and enhances that solid foundation so critical to delivering an accurate shot. 
Hasty sling
A type of shooting sling. All positions are strengthened through the use of a hasty sling. The formal tight sling is detached from the rear sling swivel and tightened above the bicep of the supporting arm. Almost any carrying strap can be used in the hasty sling mode. There is often a compromise between the most comfortable "carry" length for shooter's sling and the ideal tension for a hasty sling. The steadiness achieved is almost as good as a tight competition sling and it is a lot faster.

Competitions
In ISSF shooting events, 3 out of 7 shooting positions are used. Positions not used are supine, sitting, rice paddy squat and side position.

WBSF governs benchrest shooting.

IPSC shooting events use prone, offhand and supported shooting positions.

There are some competitions, such as felthurtigskyting, in which shooting position is freestyle. That means that the shooter decides which one of the four positions he'll use.

See also

 Direct fire
 Indirect fire
 History of the firearm
 Shooting targets
 ISSF World Cup

References

Projectile weapons

Combat
Hunting methods
Warfare of the Middle Ages